The North Pennines is the northernmost section of the Pennine range of hills which runs north–south through northern England. It lies between Carlisle to the west and Darlington to the east. It is bounded to the north by the Tyne Valley and to the south by the Stainmore Gap.

Overview
The North Pennines was designated as an Area of Outstanding Natural Beauty (AONB) in 1988 for its moorland scenery, the product of centuries of farming and lead-mining, and is also a UNESCO Global Geopark. At almost , it is the second largest of the 49 AONBs in the United Kingdom. The landscape of the North Pennines AONB is one of open heather moors between deep dales, upland rivers, hay meadows and stone-built villages, some of which contain the legacies of a mining and industrial past. The area has previously been mined and quarried for minerals such as barytes, coal fluorspar, iron, lead, witherite and zinc.

Natural England maps

Maps for North Pennines – Area of Outstanding Natural Beauty, showing Access, Designations and other criteria from Natural England:

 MAGiC MaP : North Pennines – AONB. 

 MAGiC MaP : Hadrian's Wall – World Heritage Site. 

 MAGiC MaP : North Pennines – Upland Breeding Bird Areas. 

 MAGiC MaP : Pennine Way (Tan Hill – Dufton – Cross Fell). 

 MAGiC MaP : North Pennines – SSSI (south).

Geology
The North Pennines are formed from a succession largely of sedimentary rocks laid down during the Palaeozoic era, later intruded by the Whin Sill and affected by glaciation during the Quaternary period.

Mud and volcanic ash deposited during the Ordovician and Silurian periods were buried and subsequently faulted and folded during the Caledonian orogeny, the mudstone becoming slaty. These rocks which are between 500 and 420 million years old are now exposed along the great scarp which defines the western edge of the area and also in an inlier in upper Teesdale. Unseen at the surface but proved in boreholes is the Weardale Granite, a batholith emplaced as molten rock into the slates and other rocks around 400 million years ago. Its presence beneath the region results in it being an upland area since granite is relatively less dense and therefore ‘buoys up’ the North Pennines. This uplifted area is known as the Alston Block and is partly defined by major faults; the Stublick and Ninety-Fathom faults to the north and the Pennine Fault to the west. To the south is the Stainmore Trough.

Overlying the early Palaeozoic rocks and granite are a succession of limestones, shales and mudstones dating from the Carboniferous period. At this time the part of the Earth’s crust which would later become England lay in the equatorial zone and was covered from time to time by shallow tropical seas. Repeated cycles of inundation led to the development of a series of cyclothems; the laying down of layers of limestone, shale and sandstone with occasional coal seams.

Shortly afterwards, (c. 295 million years ago)  molten rock once again intruded the sedimentary succession, this time resulting in the emplacement of the doleritic Whin Sill within the Carboniferous sequence. Known as whinstone locally, it baked the rocks with which it came into contact, resulting in the Sugar Limestone found in upper Teesdale. Cooling of the sill itself resulted in the formation of columnar joints, characteristic of its outcrop at places like High Cup. The sill has been dated at between 301 and 294 million years old thus straddling the Carboniferous/Permian boundary.

Around the start of the Permian period, about 290 million years ago, mineral-rich waters, associated with the still warm granite, circulated within the Carboniferous succession and gave rise to mineral-rich veins which have formed the basis of a lead mining industry since at least Roman times.

During the rest of this period and into the Triassic at the start of the Mesozoic era, desert sands characterised the area; these are now seen as the New Red Sandstone of the Vale of Eden, the eastern parts of which form the lower slopes of the Pennine scarp and are within the AONB. There is no bedrock of younger age to be found within the North Pennines; for much of the time since the deposition of the Triassic sandstones, it is likely the area was above sea level and subject to erosion.

A series of major global climate cycles during the current Quaternary period resulted in a series of ice ages, evidence for the last ice age is found within the North Pennines both in term of erosional and depositional features. Glacial till is widespread and drumlin are encountered, both indicative of the presence of moving ice within the landscape. It may be that some higher ground was not over-ridden by ice but remained exposed through subject to harsh climatic conditions. Glacial meltwater carved channels and rivers have continued to shape the landscape in the post-glacial era.

Economy
Besides farming, mining and quarrying have been a mainstay of the local economy over centuries. In 2013, a Canadian mining company were allowed to test drill for zinc around Allenheads and Nenthead. They said the region was sitting on a "world-class" deposit of zinc and predicted that a new mine in the area could produce  of zinc ore per year.

Natural history
In the North Pennines are: 40% of the UK's upland hay meadows; 30% of England's upland heathland and 27% of its blanket bog; 80% of England's black grouse (and also breeding short-eared owl, ring ouzel, common snipe and common redshank); 36% of the AONB designated as Sites of Special Scientific Interest; red squirrels, otters and rare arctic alpine plants; 22,000 pairs of breeding waders and one of England's biggest waterfalls – High Force. The area shares a boundary with the Yorkshire Dales National Park in the south and extends as far as the Tyne Valley, just south of Hadrian's Wall in the north.

The AONB is notable for rare flora and fauna, including wild alpine plants not found elsewhere in Britain. It is also home to red squirrels and diverse birds of prey. The impressive landscape of the North Pennines – from High Force on the River Tees to the sweeping valley of High Cup Gill above Dufton – are the product of millions of years of geological processes. The worldwide significance of the geology found in the area was recognised in 2003 when the AONB became Britain's first European Geopark. A year later the area become one of the founding members of the UNESCO-assisted Global Geopark family and in 2015 it was accorded official status as a UNESCO Global Geopark. Geoparks are areas with outstanding geological heritage where this is being used to support sustainable development.

Another of the North Pennines' oddities is that it is home to England's only named wind, the Helm Wind. It has caught out many walkers traversing the plateaux around Cross Fell, the Eden Valley fellside, and the valleys between Alston and Dufton.

Recreation
One of the many walking routes in the North Pennines is Isaac's Tea Trail, a circular route of  around the area, running from Ninebanks via Allendale, Nenthead and Alston.  In addition to this, a large section of the Pennine Way falls in the AONB, including one of the most celebrated stretches through Teesdale, a lush valley with dramatic river scenery including the twin attractions of High Force and Cauldron Snout.

Culture
The great English poet W. H. Auden spent much time in this area and some forty poems and two plays are set here. Auden visited the area in 1919 and "five years later was writing poems about Alston Moor and Allendale." He referred to the region as his "Mutterland", his "great good place", and equated it with his idea of Eden. Scores of Pennine place-names are found in his work, including Cauldron Snout and Rookhope.

Visitor centre
There is a small visitor centre at Bowlees which aims to provide a gateway to Upper Teesdale and the wider North Pennines AONB.

Notes

References

External links

North Pennines AONB Partnership website

Protected areas of County Durham
Protected areas of North Yorkshire
Protected areas of Northumberland
Pennines
Areas of Outstanding Natural Beauty in England
Geoparks in England
Global Geoparks Network members
Natural regions of England